Seiko Sports Association were one of the most popular and successful football teams in the history of football in Hong Kong. The team withdrew from the Hong Kong First Division League after the 1985–86 season.

History
Seiko was a team sponsored and named by the agents of Seiko Corporation who entered the team into the Hong Kong Third Division in 1970. They finished runners up in the Third Division (B) League with a record of 26 wins, 1 draw and 1 loss from 28 matches and won promotion into the Second Division in the following season. In 1971–72, the team captured the league title immediately after its promotion with a record of 21 wins, 1 draw, 2 losses and were thus promoted to the Hong Kong First Division for the first time. Led by four time Hong Kong Footballer of the Year Wu Kwok Hung, the team then stayed in the top flight for 14 consecutive years until they folded in 1986.

Honours
Throughout the 14 years in the Hong Kong First Division League, Seiko captured 29 Hong Kong football trophies, which included 9 times League champion, 8 times Hong Kong Senior Shield, 6 times Hong Kong Viceroy Cup and 6 times Hong Kong FA Cup. Its reserve team also captured 2 times reserve league champion.

In 1986, Asian Champions Cup (now AFC Champions League) was re-introduced after its suspension after 1971. Seiko represented Hong Kong for the competition. In the qualifying round, Seiko beat Liaoning FC from China and April 25 Sports Club from North Korea and qualified for the main round. However, the rules set by competition host Saudi Arabia were too harsh and Seiko thereforely withdrew from the competition.

Domestic
 Hong Kong First Division League
 Winners (9): 1972–73, 1974–75, 1978–79, 1979–80, 1980–81, 1981–82, 1982–83, 1983–84, 1984–85
 Runners-up (3): 1973–74, 1975–76, 1976–77
 Hong Kong Senior Challenge Shield
 Winners (8): 1972–73, 1973–74, 1975–76, 1976–77, 1978–79, 1979–80, 1980–81, 1984–85
 Runners-up (2): 1982–83, 1982–83
 Hong Kong FA Cup
 Winners (6): 1974–75, 1975–76, 1977–78, 1979–80, 1980–81, 1985–86
 Runners-up (1): 1978–79
 Hong Kong Viceroy Cup
 Winners (6): 1972–73, 1977–78, 1978–79, 1983–84, 1984–85, 1985–86
 Runners-up (2): 1975–76, 1976–77

Former coaches
 Chan Fai Hung ('新馬仔' 陳輝洪) (1970–80, 1981-82, 1983–84)
 George Knobel (盧保) (1981, 1985)
 Bert Jacobs (貝積高) (1982–83)

League results

Trivia
 Seiko was able to capture at least one champion each season.
 Seiko organised many different exhibition matches including against Brazil All-Stars, Club Atlético Boca Juniors from Argentina, AFC Ajax from the Netherlands (an incredible game which Ajax won 5-4), Hamburger SV from Germany, and a 4-3 victory over South Korean Champions Hallelujah FC.
 Seiko won Hong Kong First Division League for 7 consecutive times from 1978–79 to 1984–85.

References
 香港足球總會九十週年紀念特刊

Seiko
Defunct football clubs in Hong Kong
Association football clubs established in 1970
Association football clubs disestablished in 1986
1970 establishments in Hong Kong
1986 disestablishments in Hong Kong
Works association football clubs in Hong Kong